The 1941 South American Basketball Championship was the 9th edition of this tournament.  It was held in Mendoza, Argentina and won by the host, Argentina national basketball team.  Six teams competed despite the World War that was then under way.

Final rankings

Results

Each team played the other five teams once, for a total of five games played by each team and 15 overall in the tournament.

External links

FIBA.com archive for SAC1941

1941
S
B
1941 in Argentine sport
Champ
Sport in Mendoza, Argentina
April 1941 sports events
May 1941 sports events